Source Sandals, known in Hebrew as Shoresh Sandals, are outdoor, trekking and hiking sandals marketed as having a "Non-Slip sole even in wet conditions" and a typical patented x-strap-design. They have a strong tradition especially in the world of backpackers. They are manufactured in Tirat Carmel in northern Israel and sold all over the world.

History 

Yoram "Yoki" Gill and his wife Daniella developed the design of Source Sandals in the late 1980s  and established Source Vagabond Systems in 1990. Since then, Source (Shoresh) sandals have become  popular among Israeli backpackers, to the point where travelling Israelis often recognize fellow Israelis by their footwear.  More than 180,000 pairs are sold per year, with a growing share also outside of Israel.

Product 
The brand can be recognized by the straps forming an “x” below the ankle. Other typical features include: The sandals are delivered in a fabric bag instead of a cardboard box (the bags are often used by the travelers for toiletry and other purposes). And they feature a 'Green Dot' lifetime warranty. Every sandal bears a tag with a unique id-number, through which the sandal's manufacturing-history can be looked up. The sandals are manufactured in the company's factory in Tirat Carmel in northern Israel.

In recent years, Source has added a line of socks and hydration systems, selling to consumers and armies all over the world.

See also
Economy of Israel

References

External links
Source Sandals Official Website

Shoe brands
Israeli brands
Sandals